The Transformation of Intimacy is a book by Anthony Giddens published in 1992.

References 

1992 books
Stanford University Press books